The  was an electric multiple unit (EMU) train type operated by the private railway operator Keikyu on commuter services in the Tokyo area of Japan from 1978 until 2019.

Formations

6-car sets 
Initially delivered as three-car sets, the fleet consisted of 12 six-car sets, formed as follows, with all cars motored (M cars).

 The "xx" in the car numbers corresponded to the set number.
 The two "M2" cars are each fitted with two lozenge-type pantographs.

3-car sets 
All three-car sets were formed as follows.

Interior
Passenger accommodation consisted of longitudinal bench seating throughout.

Liveries
When delivered, the 800 series sets were painted in the standard Keikyu livery of vermillion red with white window surrounds, but were later repainted into all-over vermillion red with a white bodyside stripe following the introduction of the 2000 series trains.

Revival livery
In November 2016, set 823 was repainted into the original-style livery with white window surrounds.

History
The 800 series won the 1979 Laurel Prize from the Japan Railfan Club.

The fleet underwent life-extension refurbishment between 1994 and 2001. This involved upgrading the train interiors and also forming six-car sets from the remaining three-car sets by removing the cab ends and adding gangway connections.

Withdrawal

Withdrawals commenced in 2011 following the introduction of new six-car N1000 series sets.

The last train, set 823, made its final run as a special charter on 16 June 2019.

Preserved examples

The cab end of former car DeHa 812-6 is preserved inside the Maruzen Ikebukuro bookshop in Toshima, Tokyo. Built in November 1979 by Kawasaki Heavy Industries, and originally numbered 812-3, it was renumbered 812-6 in August 1986 following reforming as a six-car unit. It was withdrawn in December 2015, and moved to the ground floor of the Maruzen Ikebukuro bookshop building in March 2017, while still under construction.

References

External links

 Keikyu 800 series official information 

Electric multiple units of Japan
800 series
Train-related introductions in 1978
1500 V DC multiple units of Japan
Kawasaki multiple units
Tokyu Car multiple units